Public School No. 13 is a historic school building located in the Park Hill neighborhood of Yonkers, Westchester County, New York. It was built in 1900, with additions in 1905 and 1910.  It is a 3½-story, asymmetrical, steel- and wood-frame building in a Neoclassical style. It has stone, brick, and structural clay tile walls.  It has an interlocking pyramidal roof clad in polychromatic slate tiles and punctuated by large dormers.  The building has been converted to apartments.

It was added to the National Register of Historic Places in 2007.

References

School buildings on the National Register of Historic Places in New York (state)
Neoclassical architecture in New York (state)
School buildings completed in 1910
Buildings and structures in Yonkers, New York
National Register of Historic Places in Yonkers, New York
1900 establishments in New York (state)